Hattie Lawton, also known as Hattie H. Lawton, Hattie Lewis, and Hattie Lewis Lawton was an American detective, who worked for Allan Pinkerton, of the Pinkerton Detective Agency. Lawton may have been born around 1837, although most details of her life, before and after the American Civil War, are unknown. "[Hattie] Lawton was part of Pinkerton's Female Detective Bureau, formed in 1860 to 'worm out secrets' by means unavailable to male detectives."

Baltimore assassination plot against Abraham Lincoln 
Hattie Lawton, along with fellow female Pinkerton detective Kate Warne, worked with other Pinkerton agents who actively participated in the detection of the 1861 Baltimore assassination plot against President-elect Abraham Lincoln.

American Civil War
During the American Civil War, Hattie Lawton continued to work with the Pinkerton Detective Agency.  According to Pinkerton's account, in the early part of 1861, Lawton was stationed in Perryville, Maryland, with Timothy Webster, another Pinkerton agent.

After Pinkerton began his "Secret Service" for Gen. George B. McClellan, Lawton and Webster were added to the payroll of the Pinkerton's service in Washington on August 8, 1861. Lawton again posing as Timothy Webster's wife appeared in Richmond, Virginia in the early part of 1862. The two were sent by Pinkerton to Richmond to gather intelligence about Confederate army movements.

Arrest and imprisonment
Hattie Lawton tended to Timothy Webster when he fell ill at the Monument Hotel in Richmond, which prevented intelligence reports from being sent back to Allan Pinkerton. John Scobell, an African American Union spy, worked with the "twenty-five-year-old beauty", Hattie Lawton, during this time, posing as her servant.

Allan Pinkerton sent two agents, Pryce Lewis and John Scully, to Richmond, Virginia, to find out what happened to Webster and Lawton. They found Webster and Lawton, but Lewis and Scully were recognized as Pinkerton agents, arrested and later released as part of a prisoner exchange on March 18, 1863. Various sources indicate that one or both of the men, either to save their own lives or after being tricked, revealed the identity of Webster.  Webster and Lawton were arrested and after a quick trial both were found guilty. 
 

Timothy Webster was sentenced to death and executed, on April 29, 1862.  Lawton was sentenced to one year in Castle Thunder prison in Richmond, Virginia. In Confederate records, Lawton was described as "Mrs. Timothy Webster", one of a party of four Federals, exchanged for Confederate spy Belle Boyd, on December 13, 1862.

During her imprisonment, Richmond's most accomplished Union spy, Elizabeth Van Lew, visited Hattie Lawton, but it is unclear whether Van Lew was aware of the real identity of "Mrs. Timothy Webster".

Post-war years and death
Following her release from prison, nothing is known regarding Lawton's post-war years or death.

See also
American Civil War spies
Kate Warne
Timothy Webster

References
Citations

Bibliography
Cuthbert, N. B., & Pinkerton, A. (1949). Lincoln and the Baltimore plot,1861 from Pinkerton records and related papers. Huntington Library publications. San Marino, Calif, Huntington Library.
Fishel, E. C. (1996). The Secret War for The Union: The Untold Story of Military Intelligence in the Civil War. Boston, Houghton Mifflin Co.
Pinkerton, A. (1883). The Spy of the Rebellion; being a true history of the spy system of the United States Army during the late rebellion. Revealing many secrets of the war hitherto not made public. Comp. from official reports prepared for President Lincoln, General McClellan and the provost-marshal-general. New York, G.W. Carleton & Co. (Note:Pinkerton's accounts in this book are to be used with caution. It contains a high proportion of fiction.)
Quarles, B. (1953). The Negro in the Civil War. Boston, Little, Brown.
Rhoades, P. (August 2002). "The Women of Castle Thunder." The kudzu Monthly https://web.archive.org/web/20080927210547/http://www.kudzumonthly.com/kudzu/aug02/CastleThunder.html
Rose, P. K. (1999). Black Dispatches: Black American Contributions to Union Intelligence During the Civil War. Washington, D.C., Center for the Study of Intelligence, Central Intelligence Agency. http://purl.access.gpo.gov/GPO/LPS61145.
United States. (2005). Intelligence in the Civil War. Washington, D.C., Central Intelligence Agency. https://web.archive.org/web/20071212003327/https://www.cia.gov/library/publications/additional-publications/civil-war/index.html.

External links
Espionage in the Civil War
Intelligence in the Civil War.

American Civil War spies
Pinkerton (detective agency)
Women in the American Civil War
Baltimore Plot
Year of birth unknown
Year of death unknown
1837 births